Rahim Dad (also Romanized as Raḩīm Dād) is a village in Atrak Rural District, Maneh District, Maneh and Samalqan County, North Khorasan Province, Iran. At the 2006 census, its population was 227, in 49 families.

References 

Populated places in Maneh and Samalqan County